The 32nd European Inline Speed Skating Championships were held in , Portugal, from 18 – 25 July 2021. Organized by European Confederation of Roller Skating and Federação Portuguesa de Patinagem.

Venues

Schedule

Times are Western European Summer Time (UTC+01:00)

Track

Road

Marathon

Medallists

Medal table

References

External links
Official website
Event at World Skate

Roller skating competitions
Inline Speed Skating European Championships
Inline Speed Skating European Championships
International sports competitions hosted by Portugal
European Inline Speed Skating Championships